The following page lists all power stations in Niger.

Hydroelectric

Thermal

 NIGELEC = Société Nigerienne d’Electricité - The state utility responsible for electricity in Niger.

See also 
 List of power stations in Africa
 List of largest power stations in the world
 Energy in Niger

References

External links

Niger
Power stations